Cardisoma is a genus of large land crabs. Three species formerly placed in this genus are now placed in Discoplax. The four species that remain in Cardisoma are found in warm coastal regions where they live in burrows. Young individuals are often very colourful with a purple-blue carapace and orange-red legs (leading to a level of popularity in the pet trade), but as they grow older the colours tend to fade, and females may be duller than males. Although less extreme than in fiddler crabs, one claw is usually considerably larger than the other. They are omnivores, but primarily feed on plant material.

Species
The genus Cardisoma comprises these four species:

See also 
 Tuerkayana – a genus which holds crabs formerly found in Discoplax and Cardisoma

References

External links

Grapsoidea
Terrestrial crustaceans
Decapod genera